The Information Space, or I-Space was developed by Max Boisot as a conceptual framework relating the degree of structure of knowledge (i.e. its level of codification and abstraction) to its diffusibility as that knowledge develops.

This results in four different types of knowledge.

 Public knowledge, such as textbooks and newspapers, which is codified and diffused. 
 Proprietary knowledge, such as patents and official secrets, which is codified but not diffused. Here barriers to diffusion have to be set up. 
 Personal knowledge, such as biographical knowledge, which is neither codified nor diffused. 
 Common sense – i.e. what ‘everybody knows’, which is not codified but widely diffused.

The I-Space model is commonly shown as a cube with three axes: abstraction, codification and diffusion. A social learning cycle is drawn, showing how as knowledge is increasingly moved from concrete experiential Zen type knowledge to codified highly abstract (expert language etc.), where it is increasingly easy for it to diffuse independently of the knowledge holder. Once internalised it moves back to the concrete.

The I-Space framework is an acknowledged early influence on the development of the Cynefin framework.

See also
 SECI model of knowledge dimensions

References

Further reading

Knowledge management